The following outline is provided as an overview of and topical guide to the U.S. state of Mississippi:

Mississippi – U.S. state located in the Southern United States, named after the Mississippi River which flows along its western boundary.  The capital is Jackson, which is also the state's largest city. The state is heavily forested outside of the Mississippi Delta area, which had been cleared for cotton cultivation in the 19th century.

General reference 

 Names
 Common name: Mississippi
 Pronunciation: 
 Official name: State of Mississippi
 Abbreviations and name codes
 Postal symbol:  MS
 ISO 3166-2 code:  US-MS
 Internet second-level domain:  .ms.us
 Nicknames
 Hospitality State (previously used on license plates)
 Magnolia State
 Adjectival: Mississippi
 Demonym: Mississippian

Geography of Mississippi 

Geography of Mississippi
 Mississippi is: a U.S. state, a federal state of the United States of America
 Location
 Northern hemisphere
 Western hemisphere
 Americas
 North America
 Anglo America
 Northern America
 United States of America
 Contiguous United States
 Central United States
 East South Central States
 Western United States
 Southern United States
 Deep South
 Gulf Coast of the United States
 South Central United States
 Population of Mississippi: 2,967,297  (2010 U.S. Census)
 Area of Mississippi:
 Atlas of Mississippi

Places in Mississippi 
 Historic places in Mississippi
 National Historic Landmarks in Mississippi
 National Register of Historic Places listings in Mississippi
 Bridges on the National Register of Historic Places in Mississippi
 National Natural Landmarks in Mississippi
 National parks in Mississippi
 State parks in Mississippi

Environment of Mississippi 
 Climate of Mississippi
 Superfund sites in Mississippi

Natural geographic features of Mississippi 
 Rivers of Mississippi

Regions of Mississippi 
 Southern Mississippi

Administrative divisions of Mississippi 

 The 82 counties of the state of Mississippi
 Municipalities in Mississippi
 Cities in Mississippi
 State capital of Mississippi:
 City nicknames in Mississippi
 Census-designated places in Mississippi

Demography of Mississippi 

Demographics of Mississippi

Government and politics of Mississippi 

Government of Mississippi
 Form of government: U.S. state government
 United States congressional delegations from Mississippi
 Mississippi State Capitol
 Elections in Mississippi
 Political party strength in Mississippi

Branches of the government of Mississippi 

Government of Mississippi

Executive branch of the government of Mississippi 
 Governor of Mississippi
 Lieutenant Governor of Mississippi
 Secretary of State of Mississippi
 State Treasurer of Mississippi
 State departments
 Mississippi Department of Transportation

Legislative branch of the government of Mississippi 
 Mississippi Legislature (bicameral)
 Upper house: Mississippi Senate
 Lower house: Mississippi House of Representatives

Judicial branch of the government of Mississippi 

Courts of Mississippi
 Supreme Court of Mississippi

Law and order in Mississippi 

Law of Mississippi
 Cannabis in Mississippi
 Capital punishment in Mississippi
 Individuals executed in Mississippi
 Constitution of Mississippi
 Crime in Mississippi
 Gun laws in Mississippi
 Law enforcement in Mississippi
 Law enforcement agencies in Mississippi

Military in Mississippi 
 Mississippi Air National Guard
 Mississippi Army National Guard

History of Mississippi 

History of Mississippi

History of Mississippi, by period 
 Prehistory of Mississippi
 Indigenous peoples
 Spanish colony of Florida, 1565–1763
 French colony of Louisiane, 1699–1763
 British Colony of Georgia, 1732–1776
 French and Indian War, 1754–1763
 Treaty of Paris of 1763
 British Colony of West Florida south of latitude 32°22′N, 1763–1783
 British Indian Reserve north of latitude 32°22′N, 1763–1783
 Royal Proclamation of 1763
 American Revolutionary War, April 19, 1775 – September 3, 1783
 United States Declaration of Independence, July 4, 1776
 Treaty of Paris, September 3, 1783
 Territorial claims of State of Georgia from 31st parallel north to 35th parallel north, 1776–1802
 Spanish colony of Florida Occidental, 1783–1821
 Treaty of San Lorenzo of 1795
 Republic of West Florida, 1810
 Territory of Mississippi, 1798–1817
 War of 1812, June 18, 1812 – March 23, 1815
 United States unilaterally annexes Mobile District of Spanish Florida Occidental, 1812
 Treaty of Ghent, December 24, 1814
 Creek War, 1813–1814
 State of Mississippi becomes 20th State admitted to the United States of America on December 10, 1817
 First Seminole War, 1817–1818
 Adams–Onís Treaty of 1819
 Trail of Tears, 1830–1838
 Mexican–American War, April 25, 1846 – February 2, 1848
 Second state to declare secession from the United States on January 9, 1861
 Founding state of the Confederate States of America on February 8, 1861
 American Civil War, April 12, 1861 – May 13, 1865
 Mississippi in the American Civil War
 Siege of Corinth, April 29 – May 30, 1862
 Siege of Vicksburg, May 18 – July 4, 1863
 Mississippi in Reconstruction, 1865–1870
 Ninth former Confederate state readmitted to the United States on February 23, 1870

History of Mississippi, by region 
 by city
 History of Jackson, Mississippi
 History of Meridian, Mississippi
 History of Oxford, Mississippi
 by county

History of Mississippi, by subject 
 History of the Italians in Mississippi

Culture of Mississippi 

Culture of Mississippi
 Museums in Mississippi
 Religion in Mississippi
 The Church of Jesus Christ of Latter-day Saints in Mississippi
 Episcopal Diocese of Mississippi
 Scouting in Mississippi
 State symbols of Mississippi
 Flag of the State of Mississippi
 Great Seal of the State of Mississippi

The Arts in Mississippi 
 Music of Mississippi

Sports in Mississippi 

Sports in Mississippi

Economy and infrastructure of Mississippi

Economy of Mississippi
 Communications in Mississippi
 Newspapers in Mississippi
 Radio stations in Mississippi
 Television stations in Mississippi
 Health care in Mississippi
 Hospitals in Mississippi
 Transportation in Mississippi
 Airports in Mississippi
 Roads in Mississippi
 Interstate Highways in Mississippi

Education in Mississippi 

Education in Mississippi
 Schools in Mississippi
 School districts in Mississippi
 High schools in Mississippi
 Private schools in Mississippi
 Colleges and universities in Mississippi
 University of Mississippi
 Mississippi State University

See also

 Topic overview:
 Mississippi

 Index of Mississippi-related articles

References

External links 

Mississippi
Mississippi